Gornji Rujani is a village in the city of Livno in Canton 10, the Federation of Bosnia and Herzegovina, Bosnia and Herzegovina.

References 

Populated places in Livno